Year 1283 (MCCLXXXIII) was a common year starting on Friday (link will display the full calendar) of the Julian calendar.

Events 
 By place 

 Europe 
 June 1 – Treaty of Rheinfelden: The 11-year-old Rudolf II is forced to relinquish his claim on the Duchies of Austria and Styria to his elder brother, Albert I. According to the terms of the agreement, concluded at the Imperial City of Rheinfelden (modern Switzerland), Rudolf receives some territories in Further Austria in return. 
 June 29 – Sultan Abu Yusuf Yaqub ibn Abd al-Haqq sets out for a punitive expedition and marches from Córdoba to Jaén and Úbeda, and then northwards through difficult terrain. On the third day after crossing al-burt, the Marinid forces attack Montiel (a fortress belonging to the Order of Santiago) and Almedina.
 July 8 – Battle of Malta: An Aragonese fleet (some 20 galleys) under Admiral Roger of Lauria attacks and defeats the Angevin ships in the Grand Harbour, sent to help put down a rebellion on Malta. Lauria lands his troops at the harbour and after two days raises his banner on the fortified city of Mdina ("Old City"). 
 The first regulated Catalan Courts are reunited by King Peter III, for the whole Principality of Catalonia. It becomes one of the first medieval parliaments that bans the royal power to create legislation unilaterally.
 Daniel of Moscow, youngest son of Alexander Nevsky, unites the west side of Russia, which ends the Kievan Rus' after 300 years. He begins the Grand Duchy of Moscow under Mongol occupation.
 King Philip III (the Bold) causes a mass migration of Jews, when he outlaws their residence in the small villages and rural localities of France.
 An earthquake destroys two thirds of the cave city of Vardzia, Georgia.

 England 
 October 3 – Dafydd ap Gruffydd (or David), prince of Wales, is found guilty of high treason and sentenced to death. By orders of King Edward I (Longshanks) he is executed in Shrewsbury – his punishment for betraying the King – is to be hanged, drawn and quartered (first used as a form of capital punishment).
 Construction of Caernarfon Castle, Conwy Castle, and Harlech Castle begins in Wales during the reign of Edward I (Longshanks), as a system of defenses against possible future Welsh uprisings.

 Levant 
 June – Qalawun (the Victorious), Mamluk ruler of Egypt, signs a peace treaty for 10 years with the Crusader States at Caesarea. It guarantees the Crusaders the possession of the territory from the Ladder of Tyre, north of Acre, to Mount Carmel and Atlit. But Tyre and Beirut are excluded. The right of free pilgrimage to Nazareth is permitted for the Christians.

 Africa 
 Abu Ishaq Ibrahim I, ruler of the Hafsid Sultanate, is overthrown by the Bedouin rebellion, led by Abd al-Aziz I.

 Asia 
 February 13–14 – Battle of Thị Nại Bay: A Mongol-led Yuan expeditionary force (some 5,000 men) lands on the beach, near Champa's capital Vijaya in Vietnam. Despite being outnumbered, the Yuan invaders break the Cham defensive line and force King Indravarman V to retreat to the Western Highlands, where he wages a successful guerrilla campaign against the occupying Yuan forces.
 Mongol invasion of Burma: Mongol forces besiege the fortress at Ngasaunggyan on September 23. The Burmese garrison withstands the siege for two months, but finally falls to the invaders on December 3. The defeat breaks the morale of the Burmese defenses. Kaungsin, the next fortress in line, falls just six days later. 
 Mongol forces invade the Khmer Empire (modern Cambodia). King Jayavarman VIII decides to pay tribute rather than fight the invasion, buying peace and preserving the empire.
 Ram Khamhaeng, ruler of the Sukhothai Kingdom, creates the Thai alphabet during his reign (approximate date).

 By topic 

 Art and Culture 
 The Libro de los juegos, an early European treatise on board games (including chess, dice, and a version of backgammon), is commissioned by King Alfonso X (the Wise) (approximate date).

 Literature 
 Ramon Llull, Spanish theologian, writes Blanquerna, first major work of literature written in Catalan, and perhaps the first European novel.

 Markets 
 The German city of Goslar starts making efforts to redeem its already issued annuities, a sure indication of financial difficulty, and maybe an early sign of the 13th century crisis.

 Religion 
 January 2 – Most of Dublin, including St. Patrick's Cathedral, is burned in a fire.

Births 
 April 9 – Margaret (Maid of Norway), queen of Scotland (d. 1290)
 Anthony de Lucy (or Luci), English nobleman and knight (d. 1343)
 Fujiwara no Kinshi, Japanese empress consort and nun (d. 1352)
 Galvano Fiamma, Italian Dominican monk and chronicler (d. 1344)
 Isabella of Castile, daughter of Sancho IV (the Brave) (d. 1328)
 John of Charolais (or Clermont), French nobleman (d. 1322)
 Matteo Villani, Italian historian, chronicler and writer (d. 1363)
 Shuho Myocho, Japanese teacher and Zen Master (d. 1338)
 Siemowit II of Masovia, Polish nobleman and prince (d. 1345)
 Yoshida Kenkō, Japanese Buddhist monk and writer (d. 1350)

Deaths 
 January 9 – Wen Tianxiang, Chinese poet and politician (b. 1236)
 March 23 – Joseph I (Galesiotes), Byzantine abbot and patriarch
 April 9 – Margaret (Maid of Scotland), queen of Norway (b. 1261)
 April 23 – John de Bradfield, English monk, precentor and bishop
 June 7 – Robert of Holy Island, English monk, sacrist and bishop
 August 12 – Blanche of Navarre, Breton noblewoman (b. 1226)
 September 26 – Kuniko (or Hoshi), Japanese empress (b. 1209)
 October 3 – Dafydd ap Gruffydd (or David), Welsh prince (b. 1238)
 October 10 – Peter of Castile, Spanish prince (infante) (b. 1260)
 October 15 – John I, German nobleman (House of Mecklenburg) 
 November 27 – John of Montfort, Outremer nobleman and knight
 November 30 – John of Vercelli, Italian Master General (b. 1205)
 December 8 – Richard of Ware, English abbot and theologian 
 December 15 – Philip I (or Courtenay), Latine emperor (b. 1243)
 December 25 – Manuel of Castile, Spanish nobleman (b. 1234)
 Abutsu-ni, Japanese noblewoman, nun, poet and writer (b. 1222)
 Alexander Stewart (or Dundonald), Scottish nobleman (b. 1220)
 Ata-Malik Juvayni, Persian ruler, historian and writer (b. 1226)
 Hermann III, German nobleman (House of Ascania) (b. 1230)
 Siraj al-Din Urmavi, Ayyubid scholar and philosopher (b. 1198)
 Xie Daoqing, Chinese empress consort and regent (b. 1210)
 Yaghmurasen ibn Zyan, Zayyanid ruler of Tlemcen (b. 1206)
 Yolanda of Vianden, Luxembourgian nun and prioress (b. 1231)
 Zakariya al-Qazwini, Persian astronomer and writer (b. 1203)

References